ITC Limited is an Indian conglomerate company headquartered in Kolkata. ITC has a diversified presence across industries such as FMCG, hotels, software, packaging, paperboards, specialty papers and agribusiness. The company has 13 businesses in 5 segments. It exports its products in 90 countries. Its products are available in 6 million retail outlets.

As of 2019–20, ITC had an annual turnover of US$10.74 billion and a market capitalisation of US$35 billion. In December 2022, their market cap stood at ₹4,22,447.30 crore. It employs 36,500 people at more than 60 locations across India.

History

Tobacco business and early years
"ITC Limited" was originally named "Imperial Tobacco Company of India Limited", succeeding W.D. & H.O. Wills on 24 August 1910 as a British-owned company registered in Kolkata. Since the company was primarily based on agricultural resources,  it ventured into partnerships in 1911 with farmers from the southern part of India to source leaf tobacco. Under the company's umbrella, the "Indian Leaf Tobacco Development Company Limited" was formed in Guntur district of Andhra Pradesh in 1912. The first cigarette factory of the company was set up in 1913 in Bangalore.

In 1928, construction began for the company's headquarters, the 'Virginia House' at Calcutta. ITC acquired Carreras Tobacco Company's factory at Kidderpore in 1935 to further strengthen its presence. ITC helped set up an indigenous cigarette tissue-paper-making plant in 1946 to reduce import costs significantly. Then, a factory for printing and packaging was set up in Madras in 1949. The company acquired the manufacturing business of Tobacco Manufacturers (India) Limited and the complementary lithographic printing business of Printers (India) Limited in 1953.

Towards Indianisation and Business Diversification

The company was converted into a Public Limited Company on 27 October 1954. The first step towards Indianization was taken in the same year with 6% of the Indian shareholding of the company. ITC also became the first Indian company to foray into consumer research during this time. During the 1960s, technology was given more focus on setting up cigarette machinery and filter-rod manufacturing facilities aimed at achieving self-sufficiency in cigarette-making.

Ajit Narain Haskar became the company's first Indian chairman in 1969 and this was crucial in building up the Indian management for the company. As the company's ownership was progressively Indianised, under Haskar's leadership, the name of the company was changed from "Imperial Tobacco Company of India Limited" to "India Tobacco Company Limited" in 1970. ITC also became the first company in India to start from the 1971 Scissor's Cup. Innovative market campaigns and electronic data processing were started in the 1970s.

In 1973, ITC set up its integrated research center in Bangalore, aimed at diversification and venturing into newer businesses with research and development. With the unfolding diversification plans, the name of the company was changed to 'I.T.C. Limited' in 1974. The Indian shareholding grew further to 40% during this time. ITC entered into the hospitality sector with hotel business in 1975 with the acquisition renaming of ITC Welcomgroup Hotel Chola in Madras. ITC chose the hospitality sector for its potential to earn high levels of foreign exchange, create tourism infrastructure and generate large-scale direct and indirect employment.

The shareholding went over 60% in 1976 and more hotels were started by the company in the following years. ITC Sangeet Research Academy was set up at Calcutta in 1977. In 1979, ITC entered the paperboards business by promoting ITC Bhadrachalam Paperboards Limited. J N Sapru took over as the company's chairman in 1983 and the international expansion started with the acquisition of Surya Nepal Private Limited in 1985. The year 1986 saw vigorous moves from the company with the opening of an Indian restaurant  in the city of New York, acquisition and renaming of Vishvarama Hotels to ITC Hotels Limited, setting up of two new ventures – the ITC Classic Finance Limited and ITC Agro Tech Limited under its umbrella. ITC also entered into the edible oils industry with the launch of the Sundrop brand of cooking oils in 1988. Tribeni Tissues Limited was acquired in 1990. K L Chugh assumed the role of chairman in 1991 and ITC Global Holding Private limited was started as an international trading company in Singapore in 1992. In 1994, all the hotels under the company were transferred into the listed subsidiary company ITC Hotels Limited. ITC, through the brand Wills, sponsored the 1996 Cricket World Cup.

Y.C. Deveshwar took over as the company's chairman in 1996 and the corporate governance structure was re-crafted to support the effective management of multiple businesses. ITC exited from edible oils business and financial services; sold the ITC Classic Finance Limited to ICICI Limited and handled the Sundrop business to ConAgra Foods Limited in 1998. In the year 2000, an innovative initiative for farmers called "e-Choupal" was started in Madhya Pradesh 2000. The same year witnessed the launch of ITC's Wills Sport range of casual wear with its first retail outlet in New Delhi and ITC's entry into stationery products and gifting business introducing the 'Expressions' range of greeting cards and Classmate notebooks. A wholly owned information technology subsidiary, ITC Infotech India Limited was also started in 2000 and the ITC Bhadrachalam Paperboards Limited was merged into ITC Limited. The name of the company was changed to "ITC Limited" omitting the dots and adapting the strategy "No stops for ITC" in 2001. An employee stock option scheme was introduced for the first time and a web portal for the company was launched. Subsidiaries for ITC Infotech were set up in the United Kingdom and the USA.

Name
Established in 1910 as the Imperial Tobacco Company of India Limited, the company was renamed as the India Tobacco Company Limited in 1970 and later to I.T.C. Limited in 1974. The company now stands renamed ITC Limited, where "ITC" today is no longer an acronym.

Shareholding and listings 
ITC's equity shares are listed on Bombay Stock Exchange (BSE), National Stock Exchange of India (NSE) and Calcutta Stock Exchange (CSE). The company's Global Depository Receipts (GDRs) are listed on the Luxembourg Stock Exchange. ITC is a constituent of two major stock market indices of India: BSE SENSEX and NIFTY 50 of NSE.

Employees
As per the Annual report of the company, it had 28000+ employees as on 31 March 2020. It spent 2,145 crores on Employee benefits during the FY 2012–13. During the same year, its attrition rate was 12%.

ITC's Chairman Yogesh Chandra Deveshwar (d. 2019) won renowned awards and recognition including Padma Bhushan from Govt. of India 2005–09, by Boston Consulting Group and seventh-best-performing CEO in the world by Harvard Business Review.

Meera Shankar, Indian ambassador to the USA between 2009 and 2011, joined the board of ITC Limited in 2012 as the first woman director in its history. She is an additional non-executive director of the company.

References

External links
 Official website

BSE SENSEX
NIFTY 50
Tobacco companies of India
Companies based in Kolkata
Conglomerate companies established in 1910
Indian companies established in 1910
Food and drink companies of India
ITC Limited
Companies listed on the National Stock Exchange of India
Companies listed on the Bombay Stock Exchange